FastAPI is a Web framework for developing RESTful APIs in Python. FastAPI is based on Pydantic and type hints to validate, serialize, and deserialize data and automatically auto-generate OpenAPI documents.

It fully supports asynchronous programming and can run with Gunicorn and ASGI servers for production, such as Uvicorn and Hypercorn. To improve developer-friendliness, editor support was considered since the project's earliest days.

Adoption and real-world usage 

FastAPI was the third most loved web framework in Stack Overflow 2021 Developer Survey.

T. Danka stressed its value for data science applications.

Large companies like Uber and Netflix use it to develop some of their applications.

Example 
The following code shows a simple web application that displays "Hello World!" when visited:

from fastapi import FastAPI

app = FastAPI()

@app.get("/")
def read_root():
    return "Hello World!"

See also 

 Django
 Flask
 Pylons project
 Web2py
 Tornado
 Comparison of web frameworks
 Representational state transfer
 Python (programming language)

External links

References

2018 software
Python (programming language) web frameworks
Software using the MIT license